Back Roads and Abandoned Motels is the tenth studio album by the alt country band The Jayhawks, released on July 13, 2018.

Background
Along with two new songs written by Gary Louris, the album mainly features songs co-written by Louris for previous projects. They include "Come Cryin' to Me" (Natalie Maines' album Mother); "Everybody Knows" and "Bitter End" (Dixie Chicks' album Taking the Long Way); "Gonna Be a Darkness" (Jakob Dylan); "Bird Never Flies" (Ari Hest); "Need You Tonight" (Scott Thomas); "El Dorado" (Carrie Rodriguez); "Backwards Women" (The Wild Feathers) and "Long Time Ago" (Emerson Hart). "These [songs] did not feel like covers," Louris said. "These songs all felt like they were in our wheelhouse."

Reception

In his review for Allmusic, critic Mark Deming wrote the album "finds Louris and his bandmates mixing up their formula, introducing new edges and angles to the group's evocative, lonesome Midwestern sound." and "this album demonstrates that Louris still knows how to make a memorable album as the group's sole leader." PopMatters called the album "a triumph" and "All of the classic signifiers of a Jayhawks album are here—the sublime harmonies, the folk-rock jangle, the wry takes on relationships, and an eye always tuned to the impermanence of things—but with Karen Grotberg and Tim O'Reagan each taking lead on two of the album's cuts, the band plays with a looser confidence than they've previously captured in the studio."

Track listing
"Come Cryin' to Me" (Gary Louris, Natalie Maines, Martie Maguire, Emily Robison) – 3:41	
"Everybody Knows" (Louris, Maines, Robison, Maguire) – 4:09	
"Gonna Be a Darkness" (Jakob Dylan, Louris) – 4:58	
"Bitter End" (Robison, Maines, Louris, Maguire) – 4:16	
"Backwards Women" (Louris, Joel King, Taylor Burns, Ricky Young) – 3:36	
"Long Time Ago" (Emerson Hart, Louris) – 3:57	
"Need You Tonight" (Scott Thomas, Louris, Kristen Hall) – 3:17	
"El Dorado" (Carrie Rodriguez, Louris, Malcolm Burn, Sandra Jennifer (Sandrine) Daniels) – 4:06	
"Bird Never Flies" (Ari Hest, Louris) – 3:54	
"Carry You to Safety" (Louris) – 5:24	
"Leaving Detroit" (Louris) – 4:12

Personnel
Gary Louris – vocals, acoustic guitar, electric guitar
Marc Perlman – bass
Tim O'Reagan – vocals, drums, percussion
Karen Grotberg – vocals, piano, keys
John Jackson – mandolin, violin, guitar

Production
Gary Louris – producer
John Jackson – producer
Ed Ackerson – producer, percussion

Charts

References

2018 albums
The Jayhawks albums